Ağalaruşağı is a village in the Lachin Rayon of Azerbaijan, de facto part of the Republic of Artsakh.

References

Villages in Azerbaijan
Populated places in Lachin District